The name Jasmine has been used to name two tropical cyclones worldwide.

In the South-West Indian Ocean:
Severe Tropical Storm Jasmine (2022) – affected Mozambique and Madagascar in April, killing ten.

In the Australian region:
Severe Tropical Cyclone Jasmine (2012) – powerful and long-lived cyclone that moved into and peaked within the South Pacific basin in February. It affected several countries, especially Vanuatu and Tonga, and the name Jasmine was retired from the Australian list of tropical cyclone names following this usage.

South-West Indian Ocean cyclone set index articles
Australian region cyclone set index articles